Albert Starr (born June 1, 1926, in New York, New York) is an American cardiovascular surgeon, inventor of the Starr heart valve. Starr resides and practices in the Portland, Oregon area and is special adviser to OHSU Dean of Medicine Mark Richardson and OHSU President Joseph Robertson (OHSU) at Oregon Health and Science University. 

He received his B.A. degree from Columbia College (now Columbia University) in 1946 and his M.D. degree from Columbia College of Physicians and Surgeons in 1949. He then went on to do his internship at Johns Hopkins Hospital and his residency in general and thoracic surgery at the Bellevue and Presbyterian Hospitals of Columbia University. He was an assistant in surgeon at Columbia University until 1957, when he moved to Oregon—having been enticed, in part, by the Oregon Heart Association's promises to help fund his research and to take him salmon fishing. There he worked for the Crippled Children's Division at the University of Oregon Medical School (now the Oregon Health and Science University). Starr was an instructor in surgery when he met Lowell Edwards in September 1958. Starr has said of this meeting, "He was in his 60s and I was in my 30s, but there was no generation gap between us."

Starr helped invent the world's first durable artificial mitral valve and is credited with being a co-inventor of the world's first artificial heart valve in 1960.

Awards
1972: Golden Plate Award of the American Academy of Achievement
2007: Lasker Award
2015: Scientific Grand Prize of the Lefoulon-Delalande Fondation

See also
 Mitral valve replacement

References

Bibliography
 Borghi L. (2015) "Heart Matters. The Collaboration Between Surgeons and Engineers in the Rise of Cardiac Surgery". In: Pisano R. (eds) A Bridge between Conceptual Frameworks. History of Mechanism and Machine Science, vol 27. Springer, Dordrecht, pp. 53-68
 A.M.Matthews, The development of the Starr-Edwards heart valve, Tex Heart Inst J. 1998; 25(4): 282–293

External links
Surgeon Albert Starr takes on new role at Oregon Health & Science University, leaving heart program at Providence St. Vincent
Made in Portland: the world's first artificial heart valve, Sept. 21, 1960

American surgeons
1926 births
Columbia University Vagelos College of Physicians and Surgeons alumni
Living people
Oregon Health & Science University faculty
Physicians from Portland, Oregon
Recipients of the Lasker-DeBakey Clinical Medical Research Award
Columbia College (New York) alumni